Barry Stell (born 3 September 1961) is an English former footballer who played as a midfielder in the Football League for Darlington. He was on the books of Sheffield Wednesday, without playing first-team football for them, and also played non-league football for Esh Winning.

References

1961 births
Living people
Footballers from Gateshead
English footballers
Association football midfielders
Sheffield Wednesday F.C. players
Darlington F.C. players
Esh Winning F.C. players
English Football League players